Highway 222 is a highway of northeastern Thailand.

References

National highways in Thailand
Sakon Nakhon province
Bueng Kan province